Maurice Bavaud (15 January 1916 – 14 May 1941) was a Swiss theology student who attempted to assassinate Adolf Hitler in 1938.

Background

Maurice Bavaud was born in on 15 January 1916 in Neuchâtel, the son of Alfred Bavaud, a postal worker, and Helène Steiner. He attended a Lasallian Brothers school and worked as an apprentice of technical drawing beforing moving to Saint-Brieuc, Brittany, to study at the Saint-Ilan seminary to become a missionary. In France he became a member of the anticommunist group Compagnie du Mystère. The group's leader, Marcel Gerbohay, had great influence over Bavaud. Gerbohay claimed to be a member of the House of Romanov, and convinced Bavaud that when communism was destroyed, the Romanovs would once again rule Russia, in the person of Gerbohay. Bavaud believed what Gerbohay had told him, became obsessed with the idea that killing Hitler would help the plans to materialise, and finally decided to carry out the assassination himself.

Attempts
On 9 October 1938, Bavaud left France to travel to Baden-Baden, then on to Basel, where he bought a Schmeisser 6.35 mm (.25 ACP) semi-automatic pistol. In Berlin, a policeman, Karl Deckert, overheard Bavaud saying that he wanted to meet Hitler personally.  Deckert advised Bavaud that a private audience could be arranged if Bavaud could obtain a letter of introduction from a suitable foreign VIP. Deckert told him to travel to Munich for the anniversary of the 1923 "Beer Hall Putsch", which Hitler attended every year.  Bavaud followed those instructions by buying a ticket for a seat on the reviewing stand by posing as a Swiss reporter, intending to shoot Hitler as he passed during the parade. Bavaud abandoned this attempt when, on November 9, Hitler turned out to be marching in the company of other Nazi leaders whom Bavaud did not want to injure.

Bavaud next purchased expensive stationery and forged a letter of introduction in the name of the French nationalist leader Pierre Taittinger, which claimed that Bavaud had a second letter for Hitler's eyes only. He travelled to Berchtesgaden in the belief that Hitler had returned there, only to find that Hitler was still in Munich. When Bavaud returned to Munich, he discovered that Hitler was just leaving for Berchtesgaden.

Arrest and trial
Having exhausted his money, Bavaud stowed away on a train to Paris, but was detained while on his way for travelling without a ticket and, as a foreigner, was turned over to the Gestapo. He was interrogated and admitted his plans to assassinate Hitler.

After being taken to Berlin, Bavaud was tried by the Volksgerichtshof on 18 December 1939, where he declared he had acted alone, naming as his motives that he considered Hitler a threat to humanity, to Swiss independence, and to Catholicism in Germany. Swiss diplomacy made no effort to save Bavaud. Hans Frölicher, the Swiss ambassador to Germany, even publicly condemned Bavaud's assassination attempt. An offer from the Germans to exchange Bavaud for a German spy was turned down, and Bavaud was sentenced to death. He was executed by guillotine in the Berlin-Plötzensee prison on the morning of 14 May 1941.

Legacy

Bavaud's father Alfred attempted to rehabilitate his son's name and reputation, resulting in a court decision on December 12, 1955 reverting the death sentence but posthumously condemning Bavaud to a five-year sentence, arguing that Hitler's life was protected by law just as any other life. A second verdict of 1956 reverted the prison sentence and Germany paid Bavaud's family the sum of CHF 40,000 in reparation.

In 1976, German playwright Rolf Hochhuth celebrated Bavaud as a "new William Tell", while in 1980 historian Klaus Urner relativized Hochhuth's heroic picture, analyzing psychological aspects of Bavaud's motivation. In 1989 and again in 1998, the Swiss Federal Council admitted that the Swiss authorities did not make a sufficient effort to save Bavaud. Finally, in 2008, the Swiss government honored the life and effort of Bavaud.
In 2011, a small monument in his honor was erected in Hauterive near Neuchâtel.

See also
List of assassination attempts on Adolf Hitler

Notes

References
Peter Hoffmann, "Maurice Bavaud’s Attempt to Assassinate Hitler in 1938," Police Forces in History ed. George L. Mosse. SAGE Readers in 20th Century History Vol. 2. London/Beverly Hills 1975, p. 173–204.
Roger Moorhouse, "Killing Hitler," Jonathan Cape, 2006. 
Rolf Hochhut's TELL 38 is an account of Maurice Bavaud's life and includes

Further reading 
 Dokumente über die Kollaboration von Behörden der Schweiz mit der nationalsozialistischen Diktatur Deutschland. Einsehbar auf der Homepage des Eidgenössischen Diplomatischen Dienstes Dodis. Der missglückte Attentäter.
 Der Stimme des Gewissens verpflichtet - bis zum Letzten: Maurice Bavaud: Theologiestudent und Hitler-Attentäter; Requiem wider das Vergessen vom 19. November 2009  (= Romero-Haus-Protokolle, Band 121), RomeroHaus, Luzern 2010, 
 Hersche, Otmar, Spinatsch,Peter (Redaktion): Maurice Bavaud: ein 22jähriger Schweizer versucht 1938 Hitler aufzuhalten, Dokumentation zum 60. Todestag, übersetzt von Bertrand Schütz, Comité Maurice Bavaud, Bern 2001, 
 Hochhuth, Rolf: Tell gegen Hitler. Historische Studien. Mit einer Rede von Karl Pestalozzi. Insel, Frankfurt am Main 1992, .
 Steinacher, Martin: Maurice Bavaud - verhinderter Hitler-Attentäter im Zeichen des katholischen Glaubens?  (= Anpassung, Selbstbehauptung, Widerstand, Band 38). Lit, Münster/Berlin 2015, .

External links

 "Comité Maurice Bavaud"

1916 births
1941 deaths
People from Neuchâtel
People executed by guillotine at Plötzensee Prison
Failed assassins of Adolf Hitler
Swiss people executed by Nazi Germany
Swiss Roman Catholics
Catholic resistance to Nazi Germany
People executed for attempted murder